Khizar Khel (خضر خیل) also known as Khiddar Khel (خدر خیل) is a clan of Isakhel (sub-tribe) of Pashtun tribe Niazi or Niazai. Their ancestral village is Khaglan Wala, Isa Khel Tehsil, Mianwali District.
They are also living in Bannu, Khanewal, Sukkur, Hala, Bahawalpur, Karachi, Lahore, Faisalabad and many other districts.

Khizar Khan Niazi
Khizar Khan Niazi Isa Khel was born around 1511 in Lakki (Modren Day Lakki Marwat) was son of Sheikh Mukhal Khan or Sheikh Muhali Khan and sometimes Muhammad Ali Khan, Khizar Khan also had an elder brother named Sheikh Fareed Khan. Khizar Khan is ancestor of Khizar Khel clan and was Great-great grandson of Isa Khan (Isa Khel (sub-tribe),The earliest recorded mention of the Isa khel Tribe is in Baburnama, 1504-1505).

Ancestry
Khizar Khan son of Sheikh Mukhal Khan son of Mammo Khan son of Muhammad Khan son of Isa Khan son of Umar Khan son of Khirr son of Jam or Zam son of Toor or Tooran son of Hameem or Habib son of Wagan son of Jamal son of Niazi son of Ibrahim (Loe dy) son of Shah Hussain of Ghour.

Descendants
Khizar Khan had two sons Shahbaz Khan (شہباز خان) and Saadat Khan (سعادت خان), descendants of Shahbaz Khan known as Guddi Khel Khizar Khel (Sardar Guddi Khan Shaheed 1719-1761) and Saadat Khan are living in many parts of Pakistan.

Historical Books
Khizar Khel clan is mentioned only three times in historical books Hyat i Afghani by Muhammad Hayat Khan Khattar, Niazi Qabely Ki Dastaan and Tareekh-e-Niazi Qabail by Muhammad Iqbal Khan Niazi.

Chieftains of Clan

Nambardar from Clan

Notable people
 Asmat Ullah Khan Niazi, Ex Controller News PTV World.
 Bakhtiar Khan Niazi, Former Pakistani boxer who played boxing from 1972 till 1980.
 Ashfaq Khan Niazi , ARY News correspondent Sukkur
 Tariq Khan Niazi , Chairman municipal committee, Bannu in 1980's. Death, 11 September 1993.

References

Niazi Pashtun tribes
Pashtun tribes
Ethnic groups in Pakistan